Astra is a 2012 Bengali film produced by Amit Agarwal  and directed by Tathagata Bhattacherjee. This is an action film which revolves around the love story of a gangster. In this film, DaVinci Resolve — the latest colour grading software was used for the first time in an eastern India film.

Cast
 Joy  as  Baban
 Samapika Debnath as Koena Chatterjee
 Soumitra Chatterjee  as  Masoor Chacha
 Deepankar De  as  Biplab Dasgupta
 Shankar Chakraborty  as  Sambhu Da
 Biplab Chatterjee  as  Faiz Bhai
 Masood Akhtar as  Mukhtar Bhai
 Rajesh Sharma as Inspector Sanyal
 Ashoke Viswanathan  as  Police Commissioner

References

External links

2012 films
Indian action films
2010s Bengali-language films
Bengali-language Indian films